Skabba the Hutt were a Ska punk band that featured current The Bravery frontman/songwriter Sam Endicott on bass and keyboard-player John Conway, CSI: Miami actor Jonathan Togo, pornographer Will Carlough, session drummer Chris Markwood, solo-musician/voiceover-artist Brian Grosz and musician/illustrator Seth Berkowitz.

They served as the house band for season three of Comedy Central's Premium Blend under the name The El Conquistadors. The band later shortened the name to Conquistador, moved away from ska and embraced a New Wave sound. Conquistador would later release one album entitled What's Up Fireball?'.

Earlier lineups included Dave Jellis (lead vocals) and Alanna Yudin (drums).

External links
Skabba the Hutt MySpace page

Third-wave ska groups
American ska punk musical groups